is a Japanese professional shogi player ranked 5-dan.

Early life
Honda was born in Kawasaki, Kanagawa on July 5, 1997. He learned how to play shogi from his father when he was about five years old. In September 2009 while he was still an elementary school sixth-grade student, he was accepted into the Japan Shogi Association (JSA) apprentice school under the guidance of shogi professional  at the rank of 6-kyū.

Honda was promoted to the rank of apprentice professional 3-dan in April 2015. It was around this time that he began to seriously use computer shogi programs into his practice routines, and stated that he believes doing so really helped to improve his game. He obtained full professional status and the corresponding rank of 4-dan on October 1, 2018, after winning the 63rd 3-dan League (AprilSeptember 2018) with a record of 15 wins and 3 losses.

Shogi professional
In December 2019, Honda earned to right to challenge Akira Watanabe for the 45th Kiō title. Honda had advanced through the challenger tournament undefeated and advanced to the two-game challenger determination match against Daichi Sasaki. Sasaki had lost in the semi-finals of the challenger tournament, but advanced to the challenger determination match by winning the three-player double-elimination full repechage tournament for the two losers in the semi-final round and the loser in the final round of the challenger tournament to determine the player to face Honda. As the outright winner of the challenger tournament, Honda only needed to defeat Sasaki once to become the challenger for the Kiō title, whereas Sasaki needed to win two games to become challenger.

Honda lost the first game between the two held on December 16, 2019, but won the second game held on December 27. Honda's win made him first player to earn the right to challenge for a major title in his first attempt under the current eight-major-title system. It also made him the second fastest player ever to become the challenger for a major title since turning professional at one year and two months, and also made him the first 4-dan professional to become the challenger for a major title since 1992. In the 45th Kiō title match, Honda was unable to stop Watanabe from defending his title, losing the match 3 games to 1.

Promotion history
Honda's promotion history is as follows:
 6-kyū: September 2009
 3-dan: April, 2015: 
 4-dan: October 1, 2018 
 5-dan: December 27, 2019

Titles and other championships
Honda's only appearance in a major title match was in 2020 when he was the challenger for the 45th Kiō title.

Awards and honors
Honda won the Japan Shogi Association’s Annual Shogi Award for “Best New Player” for the 2019 shogi year (April 2019March 2020).

References

External links
ShogiHub: Professional Player Info · Honda, Kei

Japanese shogi players
Living people
Professional shogi players
People from Kawasaki, Kanagawa
Professional shogi players from Kanagawa Prefecture
1997 births